Glenn Henry may refer to:

 Glen Monroe Henry (1912–1983), American circus act entertainer and operator, late of Texas
 Glenn Henry (band leader) (1915–1993), American big band leader, late of California
 Glenn Henry (IT entrepreneur) (born 1942), American IT entrepreneur, executive, and inventor
 Glenn L. Henry (1921–2002), American lawyer and politician

See also 
 Henry Glen (1739–1814), U.S. Congressman